Boon was a town on the Black Sea coast of ancient Pontus, 90 stadia east of Cape Jasonium.

Its site is located near Perşembe in Asiatic Turkey.

References

Populated places in ancient Pontus
Former populated places in Turkey
History of Ordu Province